Preview is a computing function to display a document, page, or film before it is produced in its final form. In the case of printed material this is known as "print preview".

Contents preview 
Using Preview feature, users can preview and see the current stage of the process before producing into a final form. Preview lets users to visualize current/final product and correct possible errors easily before finalizing the product. Preview is necessary for markup language editing software like Web development applications.

Web development application like Adobe Dreamweaver and most HTML editors have 'Preview in Browser' feature. During webpage development, you must preview the page in a browser to see the definitive end result. Though browsers in general produce the same results, each browser version can display HTML pages somewhat differently. Preview in Browser shows what the codes will appear in specified Web Browser. For seeing the difference and seeing what your site visitors will see after you publish your pages, the Preview function exists.

Video editing applications also have preview feature to see the current product made during the editing process. 
Apple Inc.’s video editing software, Final Cut Pro’s interface has two preview windows, 'Viewer window' and 'Canvas window'. 'Viewer window' lets users to preview clips and decide which one to use. User can also make changes to clips in this window. 'Canvas window' is a program window that shows finished program and letting user to preview the creation so far.

Many interactive websites and online forums allow users to preview their contents before submitting it. This is particularly useful on sites with complex markup (not WYSIWYG), where it serves as an opportunity to identify and correct errors and formatting problems before saving the content.

Print preview 
Print Preview is a functionality that lets users see the pages that are about to print, allowing the users to see exactly how the pages will look when they are printed.

By previewing what the layout will look like when printed without actually printing, users can check and fix possible errors before they pursue on the actual printing.  Most applications have a Print Preview feature and some applications, like Adobe Photoshop or Microsoft Office, automatically open ‘Print Preview’ feature when ‘Print’ menu is selected. This feature is useful for making sure that the layout is the way user expects to be before the actual printing.

Microsoft Word’s Print Preview feature lets users to zoom in/out the document or show multiple pages in a window. 
Graphic tools like Adobe Photoshop’s Print Preview lets users to position and scale the image before printing.

Web browsers also have Print Preview feature so that users can preview how the website contents will be printed out on paper:

Internet Explorer has Print Preview feature to prevent accidents like printing ten pages where it ought to print one or printing a page with a background so dark you couldn’t read the text and wasting printer ink. In Internet Explorer Print Preview, you can adjust the paper size you'll print on, margins, and page orientation of the Web page.
Mozilla Firefox has Print Preview built in as well.
Mac OS X Safari (Web browser) lets users to preview the web page when Print is clicked. In Print, Preview button shows and by clicking Preview, it opens Mac OS X Preview (software) application and the print preview of the web page shows up.

References 

User interfaces